"I Can't Stand the Rain" is a song originally recorded by Ann Peebles in 1973, and written by Peebles, Don Bryant, and Bernard "Bernie" Miller.  Other hit versions were later recorded by Eruption, Tina Turner and Lowell George. The original version is ranked at 197 on Rolling Stone's 500 Greatest Songs of All Time.

Ann Peebles version
The song was written by Peebles, her partner (and later husband) Don Bryant, and DJ Bernard "Bernie" Miller in 1973:One evening in Memphis in 1973, soul singer Ann Peebles was meeting friends, including her partner, Hi Records staff writer Don Bryant, to go to a concert. Just as they were about to set off, the heavens opened and Peebles snapped: "I can't stand the rain." As a professional songwriter in constant need of new material, Bryant was used to plucking resonant phrases out of the air and he liked the idea of reacting against recent R&B hits that celebrated bad weather, such as the Dramatics' "In the Rain" and Love Unlimited's "Walkin' in the Rain with the One I Love".  So he sat down at the piano and started riffing on the theme, weaving in ideas from Peebles and local DJ Bernie Miller. The song was finished that night and presented the next morning to Hi's studio maestro, Willie Mitchell, who used a brand new gadget, the electric timbale, to create the song's distinctive raindrop riff. It really was that easy. "We didn't go to the concert," Bryant remembers. "We forgot about the concert."

Ann Peebles said: "At first, we had the timbales all the way through the song but as we played the tape, Willie Mitchell said 'what about if the timbales were in front before anything else comes in?'. So we did that and when we listened back I said 'I love it, let's do that'."  The organ is played by Charles Hodges, who later said: "We wanted to catch a sound like water dripping.  Willie pulled the timbales out and Howard [Grimes] did the low part and Teenie [Hodges] did the high part.  It was an overdub." Peebles said: "I have to give Teenie a lot of credit, because he added a lot of licks and details to make it right."

Produced by Willie Mitchell, the song became Peebles' biggest hit when, in 1973, it reached No. 38 on the US Pop Chart and No. 6 on the R&B/Black Chart; it also reached No. 41 on the UK singles chart in April 1974.  It was one of John Lennon's favorite songs; he called it "the best song ever". Ian Dury made the song one of his choices when he was the guest for BBC Radio 4's Desert Island Discs in December 1996. Missy "Misdemeanor" Elliott samples Ann Peebles version of the song on her debut solo single "The Rain (Supa Dupa Fly)".

Personnel

 Ann Peebles - vocals
 Howard Grimes - drums, percussion
 Charles Hodges - organ
 Leroy Hodges - bass
 Mabon "Teenie" Hodges - guitar, percussion
 Archie Turner - piano
 James Mitchell - saxophone
 Andrew Love - saxophone
 Ed Logan - saxophone
 Wayne Jackson - trumpet
 Willie Mitchell - producer

Charts

Eruption version

In 1978, Eruption released a disco-oriented remake which became the group's biggest hit. It reached the top 10 in many European charts, hitting the number 1 in Belgium for 2 weeks in March 1978.  It was also a number 1 hit in Australia and reached the top 10 in New Zealand and South Africa. In the U.S., it peaked at number six on the disco chart and reached number 18 on the Billboard Hot 100.

Track listings
7" single
 "I Can't Stand the Rain" – 3:12	
 "Be Yourself" – 3:43

12" single
 "I Can't Stand the Rain" – 6:24

Charts

Weekly charts

Year-end charts

Tina Turner version

In 1984 Tina Turner recorded "I Can't Stand the Rain" for her fifth solo album, Private Dancer, and released it as a single in early 1985 in Europe. Turner's version would find minor success in the UK, but would be a success in Germany, Austria and Switzerland.

Track listings
7" single
 "I Can't Stand the Rain" – 3:40	
 "Let's Pretend We're Married" (live version) – 4:22

12" single
 "I Can't Stand the Rain" (extended version) – 5:43	
 "Let's Pretend We're Married" (live version) – 4:22	
 "Nutbush City Limits" (live version) – 2:56

Chart performance

Weekly charts

Year-end charts

Personnel
Tina Turner – lead vocals
Nick Glennie-Smith – keyboards, synthesizers
Terry Britten – guitar
Graham Broad – drums

References

External links
  - at GRAMMYFoundation

1973 songs
1973 singles
1978 singles
1985 singles
1996 singles
Seal (musician) songs
Diesel (musician) songs
Eruption (band) songs
Tina Turner songs
Disco songs
Guy Sebastian songs
Song recordings produced by Frank Farian
Song recordings produced by Willie Mitchell (musician)
Hi Records singles
Hansa Records singles
Capitol Records singles
Number-one singles in Australia
Number-one singles in Belgium